Niles Bolton Associates is a US-based design firm providing architecture, planning, landscape architecture and interior design services. The company is based in Atlanta, Georgia, with offices in Alexandria, Virginia.  The company was founded by G. Niles Bolton in 1975 in Atlanta.  Niles Bolton Associates provides services for the residential, commercial, retail, transportation and urban design markets.

Notable projects
One Vinings Mountain, Cobb County, Georgia
San Jose State University Campus Village, San Jose, California
Savannah River Landing, Savannah, Georgia
Inigo's Crossing, Montgomery County, Maryland
Post Riverside, Atlanta, Georgia
Neiman Marcus, Ala Moana, Honolulu, Hawaii
Roman Holiday, Chongqing, China
The Howard School, Atlanta, Georgia
Poly Canyon Village, San Luis Obispo, California
First Baptist Church, Woodstock, Georgia
Original County, Tianjin, China
Athens Multi-Modal Transportation Center, Athens, Georgia
Vermont/Sunset Transit Station, Los Angeles, California
TPC Boston, Norton, Massachusetts
Byers Engineering Company, Atlanta, Georgia

Awards
 Based on residential design fees, the firm places in the top 10 among international firms in multifamily design, holding the 2nd position among U.S. firms
 Voted by Georgia Trends as one of the Best Places to Work in 2007 
 Named 2005 Architecture Design Firm of the Year by the San Jose/Silicon Valley Business Journal
 In 2010, Niles Bolton Associates was ranked as the No. 1 residential architecture firm in the United States by World Architecture

External links
 Niles Bolton Associates company website
 Georgia Trends
 San Jose/Silicon Valley Business Journal

Architecture firms based in Georgia (U.S. state)